Yongsheng County is located in the northwest of Yunnan province, China. It is under the administration of the prefecture-level city of Lijiang. In 2019 the county had a population of 406,757 including 34.42% ethnic minorities.

The Chenghai Lake is located in Yongsheng. Yongsheng has a strong agricultural output consisting especially of fruits including pomegranate, oranges, grapes, mangoes, longan,  and Sugar-apple.

Administrative divisions
Yongsheng County has 9 towns and 6 ethnic townships. 
9 towns

6 ethnic townships

Ethnic groups

The Yongsheng County Gazetteer (1989:637) lists the following ethnic Yi subgroups. Population statistics are as of 1985.

Shuitian 水田: 12,279 persons in Renhe District 仁和区 (in Xinping 新坪, Huiyuan 汇源, and Xintian 新田); Songping District 松坪区 (in Guangmin 光明 and Yonghong 永红);  Taoyuan District 涛源区 (in Jiahe 嘉禾 and Xi'an 西安); Xinaqu District 期纳区 (in Banping 半坪); Xunzhou District 顺州区 (in Ximachang 西马场, Xinhe 新河, and Banqiao 板桥); Pianjiao District 片角区 (in Shuichong 水冲)
Shuitian 水田 (autonym: Naru 纳儒)
Shui Yi 水彝 subgroup (autonym: Naruo 纳若)
Luoluo 倮倮 subgroup (autonym: Xiqima 洗期麻; also called Li 傈/黎)
Taliu 他留 (autonym: Talusu 他鲁苏): 4,489 persons in Shuanghe 双河, Yushui 玉水, Yunshan 云山, and Liude 六德 townships of Liude District 六德区
Lang'e 崀峨 (autonym: Liwusu 里乌苏): 3,490 persons in Lang'e 崀峨 and Jifu 吉福 townships of Xinghu District 星湖区
Xiangtan 乡谈 (autonym: Awupu 阿乌浦, Awudu 阿乌堵): 2,923 persons in Peiyuan 培元, Shuiping 水坪, and Yongle 永乐 townships of Da'an District 大安区
Tagu 他谷 (autonym: Tagupo 他谷泼): 1,200 persons in Dongshan Township 东山乡, Dongshan District 东山区
Tujia 土家 (autonym: Lipa 利帕): 1,165 persons in Shuichong 水冲, Bujia 卜甲, and Sijiaoshan 四角山 townships of Pianjiao District 片角区
Nazan 纳咱 (autonym: Nazansu 纳咱苏): 1,072 persons in Nazan Village 纳咱村, Liude Township 六德乡, Liude District 六德区
Zhili 支里 (autonym: Naruo 那若): more than 300 persons in Xinying Village 新营村, Nanhua Township 南华乡, Beisheng District 北胜区; and in Xianrenhe Village 仙人河村, Dachang Township 大厂乡

Climate

References

External links
Lijiang City Official Site
Further information

County-level divisions of Lijiang